Beopheung of Silla (r. 514–540 AD) was the 23rd monarch of Silla, one of the Three Kingdoms of Korea. He was preceded by King Jijeung (r. 500–514) and succeeded by King Jinheung.

By the time of his reign, Buddhism had become fairly common in Silla, as it had been introduced much earlier by Goguryeo monks during King Nulji's reign. One of King Beopheung's ministers, a man named Ichadon, was a Buddhist convert who had even shaved his head and took the tonsure. He constantly implored the king to adopt Buddhism as the state religion, and in fact King Beopheung himself had become fond of Buddha's teachings. However, the other ministers of Silla were greatly opposed to this, and expressed such defiance to the king. Beopheung, having been persuaded by his ministers, was at a crossroads, and encountered great reluctance to change. At this time, Ichadon suggested his own martyrdom and pleaded with the king to execute him in public for the cause of Buddhism. This the king refused to do, and so Ichadon deliberately insulted the ministers of the kingdom, thus provoking the anger of the king. In the end, Ichadon was executed in public, but before his head was cut off, he stated that the blood spilled from his body would not be red but milky white. According to the Samguk Yusa, his predictions proved correct, and Ichadon's milky blood horrified the ministers of the kingdom. As a result of Ichadon's martyrdom, King Beopheung finally chose Buddhism as the state religion. However, true Buddhist freedom in Silla would not begin until the reign of King Jinheung.

Beopheung sent a tribute mission to the king of Liang dynasty in 523. This envoy visited Liang with the help of Baekje. In this tribute, Baekje represents Silla as a subordinate to Baekje. 
However, Silla acknowledges this because Baekje is needed to guard against Goguryeo and Japan.

Family 
Father: Jijeung of Silla (437–514) (r. 500–514) 
Mother: Queen Yeonje of the Park Clan (연제부인박씨)
Wife: 
 Queen Kim of the Kim clan (조생부인 김씨), daughter of Soji of Silla
Daughter: Queen Jiso (지소태후) (? - 574) married Galmunwang Ipjong (입종 갈문왕)
Grandson: Jinheung of Silla
Grandson: General Mijinbu  (525-548)( 미진부), 2nd Pungwolju
Concubine: Princess Okjin of the Gyeongju Kim clan (옥진궁주 김씨), daughter of Wi Hwarang (위화랑), 1st Pungwolju
Son: Prince Kim Bidae-jeon (비대전군)
Son: Prince Kim Morang (모랑), 3rd Pungwolju
Concubine: Princess Bogwa (보과공주), of the Buyeo clan (부여씨), daughter of Dongseong of Baekje
Daughter: Princess Nammo (남모공주)

See also
 List of Korean monarchs#Silla
 History of Korea
 Korean Buddhism

References

Silla rulers
Silla Buddhists
Korean Buddhist monarchs
Buddhism in Silla
540 deaths
6th-century monarchs in Asia
Year of birth unknown
6th-century Korean people